Toni Graphia (born May 11, 1960) is an American writer and television producer.

Early life and education 
Graphia was raised in Baton Rouge, Louisiana, the daughter of Anthony J. "Tony" Graphia, a prominent Louisiana judge and current Chairman of the Louisiana Board of Tax Appeals.  She attended Woodlawn High School before going to college.

Graphia attended Louisiana State University for two years as an English major before moving west.  She enrolled at the University of California, Santa Barbara and graduated with a B.A. in communications.  She also studied journalism at Santa Barbara City College.

Career 
Graphia got her start as part of a Writers Guild of America apprenticeship program where she "...went from opening fan mail to selling scripts in just a few years..."  Her first work was as a researcher on the television series China Beach, where she met co-creator John Sacret Young, and was eventually promoted into a screenwriting role.  The two would work on further projects together, including Quantum Leap, Cop Rock, and Dr. Quinn, Medicine Woman.

Through her history with Young, Graphia created, produced, and wrote Orleans with him, which aired on CBS in 1997.  The show was based on Graphia's family and life growing up in New Orleans, with the character Judge Luther Charbonnet, played by Larry Hagman, modeled after her father.  Hagman was the first actor that Graphia thought about after creating the role of Charbonnet.

Subsequent projects saw her produce and/or write for Roswell, Carnivàle, Battlestar Galactica, Terminator: The Sarah Connor Chronicles, Mercy, Alcatraz, Grey's Anatomy, and Outlander.

Honors and awards 
Graphia's work as screenwriter and producer was cited when R&D TV, in association with NBC Universal Television Studios, won the 2005 Peabody Award for the 2005 season of Battlestar Galactica, noting "...plotlines that are deeply personal and relatable, while never compromising their affinity and passion for science fiction."

Personal life 
Graphia is based out of Los Angeles, California and has been openly lesbian since February 2006 after coming out in a "public way" at a Writers Guild of America panel.

Graphia has taught classes at her alma mater, the University of California, Santa Barbara, as well as at the University of Southern California, University of California, Los Angeles, and Emerson College.

References

External links 
 

1960 births
Living people
People from Baton Rouge, Louisiana
People from Louisiana
University of California, Santa Barbara alumni
American television writers
American television producers
American women screenwriters
American LGBT screenwriters
LGBT people from Louisiana
Screenwriters from Louisiana
Screenwriting instructors
American women television producers
American women television writers
21st-century American women